The  2008 Copa Nextel Stock Car was the 30th Stock Car Brasil season. It began on April 13 at the Interlagos and ended on December 7 at the same circuit, after twelve rounds. This season Volkswagen announced the retired from the championship.

Teams and drivers
All drivers were Brazilian-registered.

Race calendar and results
All races were held in Brazil.

Drivers' championship

References

External links
 Official website of the Stock Car Brasil (In Portuguese)

Stock Car Brasil
Stock Car Brasil seasons